"What Comes Around" is a song by American heavy metal band Ill Niño. The song was released as the second single from the group's debut studio album Revolution Revolución. The track is the band's most successful single, peaking on charts in both the US and UK. A Spanish version was recorded and released on the special edition of Revolution Revolución. The song is also included on Roadrunner Records' XXX: Three Decades of Roadrunner box set on disc two.

Track listing

Music video
The song's official music video shows the band performing the song in a field, inner-cut with footage of a group of friends interacting with each other.

Chart positions

References

2001 songs
2002 singles
Roadrunner Records singles
Ill Niño songs
Songs written by Cristian Machado